Guvacoline is a compound with the chemical formula C7H11NO2. It is a component of Areca nut and a precursor of guvacine. It agonizes musacarinic receptors just like arecoline but unlike arecoline it lacks nicotinic activity.

See also

Guvacine
Arecoline

References

GABA reuptake inhibitors
Methyl esters
Tetrahydropyridines